Humbergate may refer to a number of things.

Humbergate, Ontario, Canada
, a British cargo ship in service 1947-55